ABG may refer to:

Medicine
 Arterial blood gas, blood test
 air-bone gap in audiometry

Organisations
 Abakan-Avia, airline based in Abakan, Russia (ICAO code ABG)
 ABG Shipyard, ship-building firm based out of Mumbai, India
 African Barrick Gold, gold mining business operating in Tanzania
 Alpha Beta Gamma, international business honor society
 Authentic Brands Group, American brand development and licensing company 
 Avis Budget Group, car rental company

People
 Avrom Ber Gotlober (1811–1899), Jewish writer, poet, playwright, historian, journalist and educator
 Asian baby girl, a stereotype of Asian American women originating from Asian American gangster lifestyles and subcultures, later adopted as a fashion trend
 ABG Neal, Jewish descendant and NY based rapper.

Places
 Autonomous Region of Bougainville, Papua New Guinea
 Altenburger Land, Thuringia, Germany (vehicle registration code: ABG) 
 Abingdon Airport, Queensland, Australia (IATA code ABG)
 Atlanta Botanical Garden, Georgia, United States

Other
 Abaga language, a language of Papua New Guinea
 Acoustic bass guitar, a bass instrument with a hollow wooden body
 African Burial Ground National Monument, New York, United States
 Asian Beach Games